Němec is a common Czech surname, meaning German, "mute", or "(he) does not speak (Slavic)". It comes from Proto-Slavic *němьcь ("foreigner, German"), from *němъ ("mute") (Czech němý). The feminine form is Němcová. Slovak and Slovenian form is Nemec, Slovak feminine is Nemcová. Nemec is used in other languages.

Němec or Nemec may refer to:
 Adam Nemec - Slovak footballer
 André Nemec - American screenwriter
 Corin Nemec - American actor
 David Nemec - American baseball historian
 Dejan Nemec - Slovenian footballer
 Horst Nemec - Austrian footballer
 Jan Němec - Czech filmmaker
 Jiří Němec - Czech footballer
 Ondřej Němec – Czech ice hockey player
 Rudolf Němec
 Šimon Nemec (b. 2004), Czech ice hockey player
 Tomáš Němec (b. 1974), Czech ski mountaineer
 Vernita Nemec (b. 1942), American artist and arts activist
 Zdeněk Němec, Czech athlete

Němcová may refer to:
 Božena Němcová (1820–1862), Czech writer
 Eva Němcová (b. 1972), Czech basketball player
 Jiřina Němcová, Czech athlete
 Kateřina Němcová (b. 1990), Czech chess player
 Marie Němcová, Czech canoeist
 Miroslava Němcová (b. 1952), Czech politician, current Speaker of the Chamber of Deputies of the Parliament of the Czech Republic
 Pavlína Němcová, Czech-born supermodel and actress
 Petra Němcová, Czech model

See also
 Němeček, Czech diminutive variant
 Németh, Hungarian variant
 Nemetz, German variant
 Niemiec, Polish variant
 Čech, Czech surname meaning "Czech"

Czech-language surnames
Ethnonymic surnames